Bashir is a male given name and a surname.

Bashir may also refer to:

 Bashir, Iran, a village in East Azerbaijan Province
 Bashir, Iraq, a village south of Kirkuk